Dendryphantes nigromaculatus is a jumping spider species, known by the common name black-marked jumping spider, in the genus Dendryphantes that lives in the United States and Canada.

References

Salticidae